The Independent Socialists (SI) were a French political movement and, at times, parliamentary group in the Chamber of Deputies of France during the French Third Republic. The movement was strong from 1880 until the fall of the Republic in 1940.

At first, the Independent Socialists were a diverse set of socialists who refused to affiliate with an organized party. Before the creation of the French Section of the Workers' International (SFIO) in 1905, French socialism was divided between the French Socialist Party (PSF), the Socialist Party of France (PSdF) and the French Workers' Party (POF). Later, the name was applied to parliamentarians and local politicians who believed they held their legitimacy from voters and thus refused to follow the instructions of party leaders. The SFIO, the main socialist party, had a strong party organization, something relatively unique in the Third Republic. In the end, following the creation of the SFIO, the name was used to refer to those who did not wish to join the SFIO. A number of those people later joined the Republican-Socialist Party (PRS).

See also 
History of the Left in France

 
Defunct political parties in France
Political parties of the French Third Republic
Parliamentary groups in France
Socialist parties in France